Tibor Kangyal (born 28 May 1942) is a former Hungarian basketball player. He competed in the men's tournament at the 1964 Summer Olympics.

References

1942 births
Living people
Hungarian men's basketball players
Olympic basketball players of Hungary
Basketball players at the 1964 Summer Olympics
Basketball players from Budapest